Shibakikawa Dam  is a gravity dam located in Hiroshima Prefecture in Japan. The dam is used for power production. The catchment area of the dam is 98.5 km2. The dam impounds about 7  ha of land when full and can store 231 thousand cubic meters of water. The construction of the dam was completed in 1954.

References

Dams in Hiroshima Prefecture